A grietenij was a forerunner to the gemeente or municipality in Frisia, particularly in 
Friesland, and also in Groningen which are now a part of the Netherlands.  From the end of the 
16th century until 1851, there were a total of 30 grietenijen in Friesland.  The term grietenij means the 
administrative district of a grietman.  The term grietman means a man who greets.  The 
grietenijen were found in the counties of Oostergo, Westergo and Zevenwouden.  In the  municipality law in 1851, the term grietenij was changed to gemeente or municipality, and the term grietman was changed to burgemeester or mayor.  This resulted in consistent terms being used throughout the Netherlands.

List of grietenijen

The list contains the names of the thirty grietenijen from the 18th century.

 Achtkarspelen
 Aengwirden
 Baarderadeel
 Barradeel
 Dantumadeel
 Doniawerstal
 Ferwerderadeel
 Franekeradeel
 Gaasterland
 Haskerland
 Hemelumer Oldephaert and Noordwolde (later: Hemelumer Oldeferd)
 Hennaarderadeel
 Het Bildt
 Idaarderadeel
 Kollumerland and Nieuwkruisland
 Leeuwarderadeel
 Lemsterland
 Menaldumadeel
 Oost-Dongeradeel
 Opsterland
 Rauwerderhem
 Schoterland
 Smallingerland
 Stellingwerf-Oosteinde (later: Ooststellingwerf)
 Stellingwerf-Westeinde (later: Weststellingwerf)
 Tietjerksteradeel
 Utingeradeel
 West-Dongeradeel
 Wonseradeel
 Wymbritseradeel

References

History of Friesland
Types of administrative division